Winterville is a city in Clarke County, Georgia, United States. The population was 1,122 at the 2010 census.

History
The community was named after John Winter, a railroad official. Winterville was incorporated in 1904.

Since 1991, when the city of Athens abandoned its city charter to form the unified government of Athens-Clarke County, Winterville has been the only municipality located wholly within Athens-Clarke County.

Geography
According to the United States Census Bureau, the city has a total area of 2.7 square miles (6.9 km2), all land.

Demographics

2020 census

As of the 2020 United States census, there were 1,201 people, 449 households, and 331 families residing in the city.

2010 census
At the 2010 census, there were 1,122 people in 485 households, including 318 families, in the city. The population density was 431.5 people per square mile (162.6/km2). There were 529 housing units at an average density of 203.5 per square mile (76.7/km2). The racial makeup of the city was 73.35% White, 21.84% African American, 0.36% Asian, 0.27% Native American, 3.57% from other races, and 0.62% from two or more races. Hispanic or Latino people of any race were 5.26% of the population.

Of the 485 households 28.9% had children under the age of 18 living with them, 47.8% were married couples living together, 14.2% had a female householder with no husband present, and 34.4% were non-families. 28.7% of households were one person and 13.2% were one person aged 65 or older. The average household size was 2.31 and the average family size was 2.84.

The age distribution was 21.6% under the age of 18, 6.9% from 18 to 24, 26.2% from 25 to 44, 20.3% from 45 to 64, and 16.0% 65 or older. The median age was 41.2 years. For every 100 females, there were 94 males. For every 100 females age 18 and over, there were 87 males.

As of the 2014 American Community Survey, the median household income was $51,500, and the median family income  was $69,167. Males had a median income of $21,667 versus $27,083 for females. The per capita income for the city was $29,108. About 11.5% of families and 12.9% of the population were below the poverty line, including 18.7% of those under age 18 and 6.9% of those age 65 or over.

2000 census
As of the census of 2000, there were 1,068 people in 409 households, including 299 families, in the city. The racial makeup of the city was 78.93% White, 18.26% African American, 1.03% Asian, 0.37% Native American, 0.66% from other races, and 0.75% from two or more races. Hispanic or Latino people of any race were 1.78% of the population.

Of the 409 households 35.2% had children under the age of 18 living with them, 55.0% were married couples living together, 14.7% had a female householder with no husband present, and 26.7% were non-families. 20.0% of households were one person and 7.3% were one person aged 65 or older. The average household size was 2.52 and the average family size was 2.91.

The age distribution was 24.5% under the age of 18, 6.3% from 18 to 24, 33.0% from 25 to 44, 23.7% from 45 to 64, and 12.5% 65 or older. The median age was 37 years. For every 100 females, there were 88 males. For every 100 females age 18 and over, there were 81.5 males.

The median household income was $47,727 and the median family income  was $51,667. Males had a median income of $37,100 versus $25,000 for females. The per capita income for the city was $18,693. About 3.5% of families and 5.3% of the population were below the poverty line, including 5.4% of those under age 18 and 9.3% of those age 65 or over.

Notable people
In the late 1980s, members of the neo-psychedelia rock band Butthole Surfers lived in Winterville, where they recorded their infamous third full-length LP, Locust Abortion Technician in a tiny two-bedroom home studio they rented during the summer of 1986.

References

Further reading

External links
History of Winterville from the City of Winterville website

Cities in Georgia (U.S. state)
Cities in Clarke County, Georgia
Athens – Clarke County metropolitan area